Cawthorne Camp (sometimes spelled "Cawthorn") is a Roman site in north-east England, about  north of Pickering, North Yorkshire. The well-preserved earthworks outline two forts, one with an extension, and a temporary camp built to an unusual plan.
The earthworks date from the late 1st/early 2nd century AD. It has been suggested that they were built for practice rather than for actual military use. 

Archaeological investigation has also found indications of pre-Roman activity at the site, and also traces of later sunken dwellings (Grubenhäuser). A late Iron Age chariot burial was discovered at the site in 1905 by J. R. Mortimer and at least one other square barrow is known from the site.

The site was acquired by the North York Moors National Park in 1983.

References

External links
"Cawthorn Roman Camps" on  Wikimapia

Roman fortified camps in England
History of North Yorkshire
Chariot burials
Archaeological sites in North Yorkshire